Radosław Jasiński  (born 9 October 1971, in Trzebnica) is a former Polish footballer.

History 
Jasiński began his career with Zagłębie Lubin, a club for whom he would play several seasons in the Polish Ekstraklasa. He had a spell with Paniliakos in the Greek Super League.

References

1971 births
Living people
Polish footballers
Zagłębie Lubin players
Chrobry Głogów players
Zawisza Bydgoszcz players
Paniliakos F.C. players
Dyskobolia Grodzisk Wielkopolski players
Ruch Radzionków players
Górnik Polkowice players
Polar Wrocław players
Świt Nowy Dwór Mazowiecki players
Kania Gostyń players
Polish expatriate footballers
Expatriate footballers in Greece
Polish expatriate sportspeople in Greece
People from Trzebnica
Sportspeople from Lower Silesian Voivodeship
Association football defenders